Hypercallia inguinaris is a moth in the family Depressariidae. It was described by van Gijen in 1912. It is found on Java.

References

Moths described in 1912
Hypercallia